Adrian Clark (born May 28, 1986, Dallas, Texas) is a former amateur boxer. He founded Protect Yourself at All Times to help educate professional boxers on the business of professional boxing. After fighting, Clark managed various professional boxers, including Jerry Belmontes, James De La Rosa, and Willie Monroe Jr. He was also an advisor to Jarrell Miller and unified welterweight champion Errol Spence Jr. In 2016 Forbes Magazine named Clark in its 30 Under 30 list.

Boxing Experience 

 Amateur boxer in Corpus Christi 2008-2009 participating in 2 Golden Glove Tournaments.
 Represented Neighborhood Center Boxing Gym in both tournaments.

References 

1986 births
Living people
American male boxers
Boxers from Texas
Sportspeople from Dallas